Great Night Out is a British comedy drama which aired on ITV in 2013. It was created by Mark Bussell and Justin Sbresni and starred Lee Boardman, William Ash, Craig Parkinson and Stephen Walters. The series was axed by ITV after one series.

Background
The series follows the misadventures of four thirty-something former school friends from Stockport, Matthew 'Beggsy' Begg (William Ash), Paddy 'Hodge' Hodgkinson (Lee Boardman), Glyn Thwaite (Craig Parkinson), and Darren 'Daz' Taylor (Stephen Walters). All four love football and are lifelong fans of Stockport County. Hodge has been married for five years prior to the first episode, whilst Daz is in a long-term relationship. Glyn and Beggsy both get girlfriends as the series progresses. They frequent their local pub, the Admiral Nelson, where they often tease and banter with the landlord Warren Peterson (Ricky Tomlinson).

Actor Stephen Walters, who plays Daz in the series, described the show by saying: "Great Night Out is a positive and upbeat comedy-drama series and audiences love that sort of escapism. People don't always want to sit though something dark and hard-hitting and depressing. There's a place for those sort of shows, but at a time when people are tightening their belts this series is all about warmth, friendship and pure escapism."

Jimmy Mulville, Executive producer on the series, said: "I hope we do justice to the brilliant scripts and wonderful cast. This is a laugh-out-loud comedy about friendship, love and Stockport!”

Cast and characters

Lee Boardman as Paddy "Hodge" Hodgkinson, who sees himself as the leader of the group, although his friends don't see him that way. He speaks with the voice of authority on most subjects, even though his knowledge is often lacking. Very humorous and lovable, Hodge often banters with both Beggsy and local pub landlord Warren. While he thinks of himself as the man of the house, his penchant for avoiding responsibility and spending money leave his wife Kath in charge of their household.

William Ash as Matthew "Beggsy" Begg, who often rubs Hodge up the wrong way and winds him up. Overall though he's a friendly man, happy being single with the odd one night stand. Divorced for a year, he still pines after his ex-wife, Mandy, who left him to run off to Australia to live with her new husband, Wayne, and taking their 11-year-old daughter, Kelly, with her. At the beginning of the series he's the only one of the lads without a partner and is in a bit of a relationship funk.

Craig Parkinson as Glyn Thwaite, the lovable underdog. He's a sensitive man and a nice hard-working guy who is unfortunately always one sentence behind and forever playing catch-up. Glyn works for "Mad Tony", who is known for his hot temper. Once he has to look after Tony's house while he's in Russia, but the lads decide to have a party there when Stockport County F.C. play Manchester United. He meets his school crush, Julie, and yearns after her but seems to embarrass himself every time he attempts to talk to her, despite taking the advice of the others in the group. He eventually does win her heart and she becomes his girlfriend.

Stephen Walters as Darren "Daz" Taylor, the fourth member of the gang who is described as the eternal pessimist of the group. He is the first to pull Hodge up on his sometimes questionable fashion sense, and the first to put a negative on a situation. He often performs strange actions, such as climbing on the roof of a house and claiming it was "tranquil". It an on-again/off-again relationship with Colleen, Daz can't seem to live with her as much as he can't live without her.

Rebekah Staton as Kath Hodge, the wife of Hodge who often has the final say with her husband, who is intimidated by her, but they really do love each other. She works a stressful job at the local bowling alley during the day and many of Hodge's poor choices and mistakes in the evening.

Naomi Bentley as Colleen, Daz's long-suffering girlfriend. They share a very on-again, off-again relationship, and no-one can understand why they are still together. Quick and with a dry sense of humour, Colleen is brutally honest. She shares a house with incompetent roommate Bev, who does not get on well with Daz.

Christine Bottomley as Julie, Glyn's love interest. Glyn's school crush, she is now a gorgeous young single woman who seems to be out of his league. Following a chance meeting at a nightclub a will-they-won't-they relationship ensues. Julie visibly finds Glyn attractive and refreshing, but their relationship takes time to develop.

Ricky Tomlinson as Warren, the landlord of the Admiral Nelson pub, who will do anything he can to keep the boys coming in and spending money. A father figure who nurses a secret admiration for the lads, he also enjoys playing pranks on them and participating in banter. In an effort to draw customers and make more money, Warren has quiz nights and bingo, like other local pubs.

Susie Blake as Pam Begg, Beggy's mother whose sole objective is to ensure her son's happiness. The perfect mum, until she realizes she could make herself happy if she had a man. Now her goal is for Beggsy to find someone else rather than chasing after his ex-wife, who he obviously still loves. She doesn't interfere exactly, but he is always at her house even though he doesn't live there anymore.

Isy Suttie as Bev, Colleen's eccentric housemate who is madly in love with Beggsy. She and Daz have an intense feud, but they put up with each other for Colleen's sake. She loves cat and baking cakes, and the secret ingredient to her cake recipes is "anger". She says that lederhosen and animal cruelty are some of the things that make her angry. She has also sniffed marker pens at some point, as stated by Colleen.

Connor McIntyre as Mad Tony, a local gangster who lives in a mansion in the surrounding countryside. He is Glyn's boss and owns a dog called Napoleon, which the lads find out about rather unpleasantly the first time they visit Tony's house.

Episodes

International broadcast
Great Night Out premiered on BBC First in Australia on 29 January 2015.

References

External links
 
 

2010s British comedy-drama television series
2013 British television series debuts
2013 British television series endings
ITV television dramas
British comedy-drama television shows
2010s British television miniseries
Television shows set in Greater Manchester
Television series by Hat Trick Productions
English-language television shows